Jeffrey Alan Burroughs (born March 7, 1951) is an American former professional baseball player. He played as an outfielder in Major League Baseball from  through , for the Washington Senators / Texas Rangers (1970–76), Atlanta Braves (1977–80), Seattle Mariners (1981), Oakland Athletics (1982–84) and Toronto Blue Jays (1985). 

A two-time All-Star player, Burroughs was notable for being the  American League RBI champion and for being named the American League's Most Valuable Player that same year. He is the father of major league third baseman Sean Burroughs.  In a 16-season career, Burroughs posted a .261 batting average with 240 home runs and 882 RBIs in 1689 games.

Early life
Burroughs was born to parents Charles Douglas and Iona Mae Burroughs in Long Beach, California on May 7, 1951.  He attended Woodrow Wilson Classical High School.

Career
Burroughs was selected by the Washington Senators with the first overall pick in the June 1969 draft. Late in the year, he joined the Senators at age of 19. Considered a "good bat-no field" kind of player, Burroughs was a considerable slugging threat during his playing days. Defensively, he was capable but slow.

He was voted the American League MVP, making him one of only seven overall number-one draft picks to win the MVP title (the others are Chipper Jones, Alex Rodriguez, Ken Griffey Jr.,  Bryce Harper, Joe Mauer and Josh Hamilton) and the first Ranger to win the award. During the 1974 season, Burroughs was at the center of the violent Ten Cent Beer Night debacle at Cleveland Stadium, where Burroughs was one of the targets of thrown objects and a few punches by unruly and inebriated Cleveland fans, in a game that was forfeited to Texas.

Burroughs was selected an All-Star in both 1974 with the Rangers and 1978 as a member of the Atlanta Braves, when he entered the All-Star break with a National League-leading .324 batting average. Burroughs was also named AL Player of the Year and selected as an OF on the AL All-Star team by The Sporting News his MVP season of 1974.

He was acquired by the Braves in a five-for-one trade that sent Ken Henderson, Dave May, Roger Moret, Adrian Devine, Carl Morton and $200,000 to the Rangers on December 9, 1976.

Burroughs had fans who maintained a large banner below the right field deck titled "Jeff's Jackpot", which displayed his home run total for the season plus one.

Late in his career, Burroughs was used mainly as a designated hitter and pinch hitter. Burroughs played his final year with the Toronto Blue Jays in 1985 after being purchased by them. In 86 games, he had 49 hits and 19 runs with six home runs and 28 RBIs along with 36 strikeouts and 34 walks. He batted .257 with a .366 OBP. His final regular season game was on October 6, 1985, batting as a DH. He went 1-for-4 with two strikeouts in an 8-0 loss.  He made his first and only appearance in a postseason game, having one at-bat in the ALCS that year, batting in Game 7 in the bottom of the ninth inning against the Kansas City Royals as a pinch hitter, which resulted in a ground out.

Post-playing career
After he retired, Burroughs later coached his son's Little League team, the Long Beach All-Stars; with Sean as their star player, these teams won the Little League World Series in both 1992 and 1993, winning the former by forfeit after their opponents (who had beaten them 15–4) were found to have used no fewer than 14 ineligible players and the latter 3–2 over Panama to be the first American team to repeat as champion and only the third city to ever do so after Monterrey, Mexico (1957, 1958) and Seoul, South Korea (1984, 1985).

See also

 List of Major League Baseball career home run leaders
 List of second-generation Major League Baseball players
 List of Major League Baseball annual runs batted in leaders

References

External links

1951 births
Living people
American expatriate baseball players in Canada
American League All-Stars
American League Most Valuable Player Award winners
American League RBI champions
Atlanta Braves players
Baseball players from Long Beach, California
Denver Bears players
Major League Baseball designated hitters
Major League Baseball first basemen
Major League Baseball left fielders
Major League Baseball right fielders
National League All-Stars
Oakland Athletics players
Washington Senators (1961–1971) players
Seattle Mariners players
Texas Rangers players
Toronto Blue Jays players
Wilson Classical High School alumni
Wytheville Senators players